April Fleming Miller (born October 5, 1970) is an American politician who is a member of the Maryland House of Delegates for District 4 in Frederick County, Maryland. She was previously an at-large member of the Frederick County Board of Education from 2010 to 2018.

Background
Miller graduated from Middletown High School in 1988. She later attended the University of Maryland, Baltimore County, where she earned a Bachelor of Arts degree in biology/psychology in 1992, and the Salus University, where she earned her Doctorate of Optometry in 1996. Miller is an optometrist at Evich and Nathan Optometry and Optical Center in Frederick, Maryland.

Miller served on the Frederick County Board of Education from 2010 to 2018, and was elected its vice president in 2017. She was defeated in the 2018 general election after serving two terms on the board. In January 2020, Governor Larry Hogan appointed Miller to a five-year term on the Frederick Community College Board of Trustees, succeeding former board chair Debra Borden.

In 2022, Miller was one of four Republicans to run for the Maryland House of Delegates in District 4. She won the Republican primary, coming in second place behind incumbent state Delegate Jesse Pippy with 25.8 percent of the vote.

In the legislature
Miller was sworn into the Maryland House of Delegates on January 11, 2023. She is a member of the House Ways and Means Committee.

Political positions
Miller identifies as a "common-sense conservative".

COVID-19 pandemic
In October 2021, Miller said she opposed COVID-19 vaccine mandates for students.

Education
Miller does not support the Blueprint for Maryland's Future, a sweeping education reform bill passed in 2021, saying that she would like the Maryland General Assembly to pause its implementation as schools recovered from the COVID-19 pandemic.

In 2011, Miller expressed sympathy with a parent complaint that the textbook Social Studies Alive! Our Community and Beyond was politically tilted, saying "I think it disrespects our country, because it doesn't say a lot positive about it, and I think that's detrimental to unity." In 2012, Miller objected to allowing Toni Morrison's Song of Solomon available in high schools, saying that while she did not want to ban books, she thought the school board should be more involved in evaluating books used in schools.

In April 2016, Miller introduced a policy that required refusals by students or parents to take federally and state-mandated tests to be "honored without question".

In June 2017, Miller voted against a contract with the Frederick County Teachers Association, opposing the contract's four-year salary scale transition plan by saying that it did not benefit students and their families.

Electoral history

References

External links
 

21st-century American politicians
21st-century American women politicians
Living people
Republican Party members of the Maryland House of Delegates
Salus University alumni
University of Maryland, Baltimore County alumni
Women state legislators in Maryland
School board members in Maryland
1970 births
People from Washington, D.C.